Nisa (Bonefa, Kerema) and Anasi (Bapu), are dialects of a Papuan language of the Indonesian province of Papua, on the eastern shore of Cenderawasih Bay in Sawai District, Mamberamo Raya Regency. Language use is vigorous.

Nisa-Anasi is lexically similar to the East Geelvink Bay languages and presumably belongs in that family.

References

Languages of western New Guinea
East Geelvink Bay languages